Meridiosaurus is an extinct genus of mesoeucrocodylian that is a possible member of the family Pholidosauridae. Remains have been found in the Late Jurassic Tacuarembó Formation in Tacuarembó, Uruguay. The genus was described in 1980 on the basis of a partial rostrum that included the premaxillae and most of the maxillae. The assignment to Pholidosauridae is considered doubtful by some authors, but a 2011 redescription and phylogenetic analysis confirmed the pholidosaurid classification of Meridiosaurus.

References

Further reading 
 A. Mones. 1980. Nuevos elementos de la paleoherpetofauna del Uruguay (Crocodilia y Dinosauria) [New elements of the paleoherpetofauna of Uruguay (Crocodilia and Dinosauria)]. Actas II Congreso Argentino de Paleontologia y Bioestratigrafia y I Congreso Latinoamericano, Buenos Aires 1:265-277

External links 
 Meridiosaurus in the Paleobiology Database

Neosuchians
Late Jurassic crocodylomorphs of South America
Kimmeridgian life
Jurassic Uruguay
Fossils of Uruguay
Fossil taxa described in 1980
Prehistoric pseudosuchian genera